Bradley (formerly North Kankakee) is a village in Kankakee County, Illinois, United States. It is a suburb of the city of Kankakee. The population was 15,895 at the 2010 census, up from 12,784 at the 2000 census.

Bradley is a principal city of the Kankakee–Bradley Metropolitan Statistical Area, which includes all of Kankakee County. The county is also part of the larger Chicago–Naperville–Michigan City, IL-IN-WI Combined Statistical Area.

Geography
Bradley is located in north-central Kankakee County at  (41.146332, -87.859123). It is bordered to the south by the city of Kankakee and to the west by the village of Bourbonnais. Interstate 57 passes through the village, with access from Exit 315 (Illinois Route 50). I-57 leads north  to Chicago and south  to Champaign.

History
In 1891, North Kankakee was established when the David Bradley Plow Works established a factory, and in recognition of this, in 1895, the town changed its name to "Bradley City" (later Bradley). Bradley was mostly a blue collar town, with the Kroehler Furniture factory and the Roper Corporation factory (maker of kitchen ranges and ovens; part of their operations were in the building that David Bradley once occupied) being the major employers. In the 1980s, as elsewhere in the Midwest, these factories closed, and after their closures, parts of those factories burned to the ground. However, by the end of the decade, things changed. In 1989, a new shopping center called Bradley Square was built with Wal-Mart as the first tenant, and more shops followed. Northfield Square Mall opened in 1990. Since that time, the village has been growing.

Demographics

At the 2000 census there were 12,784 people, 5,041 households, and 3,382 families living in the village. The racial makeup of the village was 95.62% White, 1.23% African American, 0.21% Native American, 0.68% Asian, 0.02% Pacific Islander, 1.20% from other races, and 1.04% from two or more races. Hispanic or Latino of any race was 3.61%.

Of the 5,041 households 33.5% had children under the age of 18 living with them, 51.3% were married couples living together, 11.0% had a female householder with no husband present, and 32.9% were non-families. 26.8% of households were one person and 11.0% were one person aged 65 or older. The average household size was 2.49 and the average family size was 3.03.

The age distribution was 26.0% under the age of 18, 9.8% from 18 to 24, 31.5% from 25 to 44, 19.2% from 45 to 64, and 13.4% 65 or older. The median age was 34 years. For every 100 females, there were 94.3 males. For every 100 females age 18 and over, there were 90.7 males.

The median household income was $41,757 and the median family income  was $47,984. Males had a median income of $38,224 versus $24,493 for females. The per capita income for the village was $19,035. About 3.6% of families and 6.8% of the population were below the poverty line, including 8.2% of those under age 18 and 3.8% of that age 65 or over.

Places of local interest 
 Northfield Square Mall

Industry 
CSL Behring operates a large, state of the art manufacturing plant near the southern portions of the village. The facility produces plasma derived medications and equipment. In 2018 it was announced that the existing plant was to undergo a massive expansion that could possibly take up to twelve years to complete. The company bought up land to the south of the existing facility that previously housed a cooking oils plant operated by Bunge Limited, and plans to build upon that open space as a part of the large upgrade. The old cooking oils plant had ceased operations in 2015. Once complete, the plant will be split into two portions- the north campus, which includes the now upgraded existing plant, and the south campus- the new property that is currently being constructed. The project is expected to create over 200 jobs and is accruing about 450 million dollars in construction expenses.

References

External links
 Official website

1891 establishments in Illinois
Populated places established in 1891
Villages in Kankakee County, Illinois
Villages in Illinois